Give Me Beauty... Or Give Me Death! is the debut studio album by Swedish post-rock band EF. It was released through And The Sound Records in the UK and through Thomason Sounds in Japan. The UK pressing comes as a digipak while the Japanese version comes as a standard jewel case.

Track listing

Bonus Tracks

References

2006 albums
Ef (band) albums